Lehigh Township is the name of a few townships in the United States:

Lehigh Township, Marion County, Kansas
Lehigh Township, Carbon County, Pennsylvania
Lehigh Township, Northampton County, Pennsylvania
Lehigh Township, Wayne County, Pennsylvania

Township name disambiguation pages